Fordlands  is a western suburb of Rotorua in the Bay of Plenty Region of New Zealand's North Island.

The area is named for Harry Ford, whose model dairy farm became the suburb.

It was described in 2017 as the most deprived suburb in New Zealand. The suburb was an inspiration for the novel Once Were Warriors by Alan Duff.

Demographics

Fordlands had a population of 2,460 at the 2018 New Zealand census, an increase of 342 people (16.1%) since the 2013 census, and an increase of 153 people (6.6%) since the 2006 census. There were 723 households, comprising 1,164 males and 1,296 females, giving a sex ratio of 0.9 males per female. The median age was 28.4 years (compared with 37.4 years nationally), with 711 people (28.9%) aged under 15 years, 570 (23.2%) aged 15 to 29, 969 (39.4%) aged 30 to 64, and 210 (8.5%) aged 65 or older.

Ethnicities were 34.4% European/Pākehā, 67.8% Māori, 14.1% Pacific peoples, 6.2% Asian, and 1.1% other ethnicities. People may identify with more than one ethnicity.

The percentage of people born overseas was 10.6, compared with 27.1% nationally.

Although some people chose not to answer the census's question about religious affiliation, 49.8% had no religion, 35.7% were Christian, 7.7% had Māori religious beliefs, 0.7% were Hindu, 0.2% were Muslim, 0.2% were Buddhist and 0.6% had other religions.

Of those at least 15 years old, 162 (9.3%) people had a bachelor's or higher degree, and 417 (23.8%) people had no formal qualifications. The median income was $19,800, compared with $31,800 nationally. 63 people (3.6%) earned over $70,000 compared to 17.2% nationally. The employment status of those at least 15 was that 726 (41.5%) people were employed full-time, 234 (13.4%) were part-time, and 243 (13.9%) were unemployed.

References

Suburbs of Rotorua
Populated places in the Bay of Plenty Region